The Stade Marcel-Tribut is a multi-purpose stadium in Dunkirk, France. It is the home ground of Ligue 2 club USL Dunkerque.

Gallery

References

External links 
 USL Dunkerque website

USL Dunkerque
Football venues in France
Sports venues in Nord (French department)
Buildings and structures in Dunkirk
Sports venues completed in 1933